Gene John Kennedy (born 18 April 2003) is an English professional footballer who plays as a midfielder for the  club  Colchester United.

Career
A youth product of the Colchester United Academy since U10 level, Kennedy worked his way up through the youth categories at the club after joining from Kelvedon Hatch. He made his professional debut for Colchester in a 1–0 EFL Cup loss to Birmingham City on 10 August 2021. He made his English Football League debut for the club on 21 August 2021, coming off the bench in Colchester's 2–1 win at Oldham Athletic.

Career statistics

References

External links

2003 births
Living people
Sportspeople from Harlow
English footballers
Colchester United F.C. players
Association football midfielders
English Football League players